Calvary is a census-designated place and unincorporated community in Grady County, Georgia, United States. As of the 2010 census its population was 161.

Agriculture is an important part of the local economy. The top crops in the county are cotton, corn and peanuts, while chickens are overwhelmingly the most important livestock. Hurricane Michael struck the region on Wednesday, October 10, 2018, causing catastrophic damage to agriculture.

History
The area where Calvary is located was settled circa 1835-1836 by emigrants from Sampson County, North Carolina. Settlers claimed they chose the area after hearing claims that the soil was similar to their home county, and so would support similar crops. The community was referred to by some as the North Carolina settlement after these Carolina settlers.

A.J. Johnson's 1863 "Map of Georgia and Alabama" does not identify Calvary by name, but an 1883 Map of Georgia by Georgia Franklin Cram does identify Calvary in Decatur County. In 1910 the community is labeled Calvary on the "Rand McNally Map of Georgia."

On 15 June 1869 Harrison Fairbanks was named Postmaster in Calvary, Georgia (then part of Decatur County). Grady County, including Calvary, was founded from parts of Decatur County and Thomas County on August 17, 1905.

Historical Census statistics offer a picture of a healthy agricultural community in the century after the Carolina settlement began in the mid-1830s. While none of the names of the founding families can be found in the 1830 Decatur County, Georgia Census, by 1840 names like Butler, Faircloth, Herring, Higdon, Maxwell and Williams with North Carolina roots are scattered through the 1,870 individuals in the "Decatur County 553rd District G.M., commanded by Captain Wamack"  (Calculated by review of records at Ancestry.com subscription service).

By 1870, the Harrison Precinct with post office in Calvary in Decatur County, Georgia records 1,168 individuals in 188 dwellings and households. In 1880 Harrison Precinct is designated at Militia District 553 in Decatur County, Georgia. There are 194 households and dwellings, and 1,003 individuals. The 1890 Census for Decatur County, Georgia is lost. The 1900 Census for Calvary (Militia District 553)  in Decatur County shows 1,385 individuals in 284 households and dwellings. (Calculated by review of records at Ancestry.com subscription service).

By 1910 Calvary is in Grady County, Georgia. The county was formed in 1905. The 1910 Census of Higdon Militia District 553 lists 258 households and 1,351 individuals. (Calculated by review of records at Ancestry.com subscription service). In 1920 those numbers were 286 households and 1,488 individuals. The 1930 Census recorded 310 households, 309 dwellings and 1,674 individuals. By 1940, the number of households had grown to 351 but the total population was down to 1,485 individuals.

Mule Day
The Calvary Lions Club organizes Mule Day, an annual festival to celebrate the important historical role of the mule in the region's agriculture. A parade, mule contests, demonstrations of sugar cane syrup-making, arts and crafts, and a smorgasbord of traditional Southern food can be found on the first Saturday in November. As many as 100,000 people visit the small town each year for Mule Day festivities.

Demographics 

The U.S. Census Bureau identifies Calvary as a census-designated place, roughly equivalent to an incorporated place, for the purposes of statistics. As of the 2010 Decennial Census of Population and Housing, there were 161 people  residing in the city.

The racial makeup of the city was 78.9% White, 8.7% African American, 0.6% Native American, 2.06% from other races, and 1.2% from two or more races. Hispanic or Latino of any race were 2.54% of the population. The male/female distribution is almost equal, with 82 (50.9%) male and 79 (49.1%) female.

The median age was 42.8. The 2010 age distribution was:

 Total: 161 People (100%)
 Under 5 years - 13 people (8.1%)
 5–9 years - 10 people (6.2%)
 10–14 years - 8 people (5.0%)
 15–19 years - 13 people (8.1%)
 20–24 years - 10 people (6.2%)
 25–29 years - 8 people (5.0%)
 30–34 years - 9 people (5.6%)
 35–39 years - 4 people (2.5%)
 40–44 years - 12 people (7.5%)
 45–49 years - 9 people (5.6%)
 50–54 years - 17 people (10.6%)
 55–59 years - 13 people (8.1%)
 60–64 years - 5 people (3.1%)
 65–69 years - 8 people (5.0%)
 70–74 years - 8 people (5.0%)
 75–79 years - 8 people (5.0%)
 80–84 years - 4 people (2.5%)
 85 years and over - 2 people (1.2%)

There were 67 households and, of those, 21 (31.3%) had children under the age of 18 living with them, 32 (47.8%) were married couples living together, 7 (10.4%) had a female householder with no husband present, 5 (7.5%) had a male householder with no wife present, and 23 (34.3%) were designated nonfamily households. The average household size was 2.40 and the average family size was 2.91. There were 85 housing units—67 occupied and 18 vacant. 68.7% of occupied homes were by owners and 31.3% by renters.

The estimated 2017 median income was $85,893 and the mean income was $70,773 for a household in Calvary from the 2013-2017 American Community Survey 5 Year Estimates.

References

Census-designated places in Grady County, Georgia
Unincorporated communities in Georgia (U.S. state)
Census-designated places in Georgia (U.S. state)
Unincorporated communities in Grady County, Georgia